Durnford is a surname, and may refer to;

 Anthony Durnford, British Army officer
 Elias Durnford, British Army officer
 Elias Walker Durnford, British engineer
 Isaac Durnford, Canadian actor
 John Durnford, Admiral in the Royal Navy
 John Durnford (cricketer), English cricketer
 Richard Durnford, Bishop of Chichester
 John Durnford-Slater, British Army officer
 Robin Durnford-Slater, Admiral in the Royal Navy

See also

 Durnford, Wiltshire, a parish in England
 Durnford School, Dorset, England
 Mount Durnford, Antarctica